Stuart Hodge Walker (April 19, 1923 – November 12, 2018) was an American Olympic yachtsman, writer, and a professor of pediatrics. He competed as a sailor at the Olympic Games; won many national and international championships in different classes and wrote over ten books.

Biography
Born in 1923 in Brooklyn, New York, Walker attended school in suburban Hartsdale and Bronxville, college at Middlebury College, and medical school at New York University. He was married to Frances (née Taylor) from 1944 until her death on September 30, 2012. They have two daughters Susan (1946) and Lee (1950). Walker was assigned in 1946 as a medical officer to the Army of Occupation of Japan ( 11th Airborne Division (Paratroops)). After reassignment from the army, he started a pediatric practice in Annapolis in 1953. Stuart became a full-time Professor of Pediatrics at the University of Maryland School of Medicine in 1961 and was Chief of Pediatrics at Mercy Hospital in Baltimore until his retirement in 1984. After Frances' death, Stuart married Patricia (née Empey) in 2013.

Sailing in the International 14 class, Walker was a member of every American team in international matches between 1961 and 1971 and was, in 1963, the first American to win Bermuda's Princess Elizabeth Trophy and, in 1964, England's Prince of Wales Cup. He was a member of the American Olympic Team, sailing a 5.5 Meter at the 1968 Games and the Pan-American Games, and a Soling in the 1979 Pan-American Games and the 2012 Vintage Yachting Games.

Walker authored ten books on sailboat racing, sail trim, competitive behavior, and low level wind flow, and was a lecturer and contributor to sailing magazines. He helped found the Severn Sailing Association. He published his 11th book, "Travels with Thermopylae", in 2015, which describes a year of sailing and discovery in central Europe.

Walker was President of the International Soling Class from 1991 through 1994 . In this role he successfully campaigned to keep the Soling in the 1996 Olympics and to continue the fleet/match format. He also established a Technical Committee that included the major builders and which has been successful in openly recognizing and solving problems before they become significant. He travelled on a yearly basis to Europe to compete in Soling regattas.

Retirement

After finishing fifth at the eighth race of the 2016 European Championship Soling at Traunsee, Austria and leading the fleet to the weather mark in the ninth and last race, Walker announced his retirement from sailing on May 23, 2016, due to macular degeneration. With his retirement, he completed a period of 47 years of Soling sailing. After his retirement, Stuart continued sailing local races at the Severn Sailing Association in Annapolis. He died on November 12, 2018, in Annapolis from stomach cancer at the age of 95.

Palmarès

 Honours
 Sailing World Hall of Fame:Member 1982 – selected as one of the world’s twenty outstanding yachtsmen.
 Stuart was inducted into the United States National Sailing Hall of Fame in 2013.
 1968 Olympics
 8th U.S. Olympic Team – 5.5 Meter.
 Team Meteorologist
 Vintage Yachting Games
 5th 2012  – Soling.
 1979 Pan American Games
 Gold 1979 U.S. Pan-American Team – Soling.
 European Championship Soling
 2nd 2011 .
 National Championships in Soling
 Winner 1973 
 Winner 1983 
 Winner 1987 
 Winner 1988 
 Winner 1988 
 Winner 2003 
 Winner 2003 
 Winner 2007 
 International 14
 Member U.S. International Teams 1961, 1963, 1965, 1967, 1969 and 1971
 Winner 1961 Princess Elizabeth Trophy (1st American ever) – 
 Winner 1962 Buzzard's Bay Bowl
 Winner 1964 Prince of Wales Cup (1st American ever) – Lowestoft, 
 Winner 1966 Yachting Magazine's One-of-a-Kind Regatta
 Soling
 Winner 1973 Great Lakes Championship
 Winner 1973 Maritime Provinces Championship
 Winner 1974 Atlantic Coast Championship
 Winner 1982 Australian Gold Cup 
 Winner 1984 Erich Hirt Trophy 
 Winner 1984 Jungfrau Trophy 
 Winner 1985 Jungfrau Trophy 
 Winner 1988 European Lakes Cup
 Winner 1992 Erich Hirt Trophy 
 Ice Bowl (Annapolis)
 Winner 1955–2011  – (32 times out of 58)

Bibliography
Walker contributed to the sailing world by writing over ten books on sports in general and on sailing specifically:
 The Techniques of Small Boat Racing OCLC 8003492
 The Tactics of Small Boat Racing 
 Performance Advances in Small Boat Racing OCLC 10881
 Wind and Strategy 
 Advanced Racing Tactics 
 Winning: The Psychology of Competition 
 A Manual of Sailtrim 
 Positioning: The Logic of Sailboat Racing 
 The Sailors's Wind 
 The Code of Competition 
 Travels with Thermopylae

References

 
 

  
  
  
  

1923 births
2018 deaths
American male sailors (sport)
American pediatricians
Middlebury College alumni
Military personnel from New York City
Olympic sailors of the United States
Writers from Brooklyn
People from Hartsdale, New York
People from Bronxville, New York
Physicians from New York City
Sailors at the 1968 Summer Olympics – 5.5 Metre
Soling class sailors
Sportspeople from Brooklyn
United States Army Medical Corps officers